John Oscroft may refer to:

 John Oscroft (cricketer, born 1807) (1807–1857), English cricketer
 John Oscroft (cricketer, born 1846) (1846–1885), English cricketer